Eutelsat 117 West A, formerly Satmex 8, is a geostationary communications satellite operated by Eutelsat. Previously operated by Satmex, it was launched by a Proton-M/Briz-M rocket in March 2013 to replace Satmex 5, and is being used to provide communication services to North, Central and South America, with broadband, voice and data transmission, and video broadcasting services. The satellite was transferred from Satmex to Eutelsat when the companies merged in 2014, being renamed as part of the Eutelsat fleet in May 2014.

Specifications
The satellite is model SSL 1300E and carries twenty four C band transponders operating with 36 MHz and forty transponders in the  operating with 36 MHz.

References

Spacecraft launched in 2013
Satellites of Mexico
2013 in Mexico
Eutelsat satellites
Communications satellites in geostationary orbit
Spacecraft launched by Proton rockets